Ayia Marina is a village located in the Paphos District of Cyprus, in the Tylliria region.

External links
 Agia Marina Chrysochous Official Website
Agia Marina Chrysochous

Communities in Paphos District